Saturn LVIII, provisionally known as S/2004 S 26, is the outermost known natural satellite of Saturn. Its discovery was announced by Scott S. Sheppard, David C. Jewitt, and Jan Kleyna on October 7, 2019 from observations taken between December 12, 2004 and March 21, 2007. It was given its permanent designation in August 2021.

Saturn LVIII is about 4 kilometres in diameter, and orbits Saturn at an average distance of 26.676 Gm (0.178 AU) in 1627.18 days (the only satellite known to take over 4 years to orbit Saturn), at an inclination of 171° to the ecliptic, in a retrograde direction and with an eccentricity of 0.165.

References

Norse group
Irregular satellites
Moons of Saturn
Discoveries by Scott S. Sheppard
Astronomical objects discovered in 2019
Moons with a retrograde orbit